The Parliamentary Elections Act 1695 (7 & 8 Will 3 c 25) was an Act of the Parliament of England regulating elections to the English House of Commons.

Provisions
Section 3 of the Act required that an election to a county constituency had to take place at the county court, and that the court had to be held at the place where it had most often been held in the preceding forty years (in effect, at the county town). This was to prevent an electoral abuse where the county sheriff held the election at a place more convenient for voters favourable to one of the candidates.

Section 6 sought to prevent faggot voters by requiring that the a voter's forty shilling freehold was a bona fide holding and not a temporary conveyance.

Section 7 established the minimum voting age and age of candidacy as 21, which was the age of majority under common law. Underage MPs were seldom unseated before the Reform Act 1832: Vicount Jocelyn was 18 in 1806.

Section 8 provided that polling in Yorkshire, previously begun on a Monday, should instead begin on Wednesday. This was from a sabbatarian desire to prevent voters travelling on Sunday to the polling place.

Section 9 provided that the poll for Hampshire would be taken first at Winchester and then, after an adjournment, at Newport for the convenience of voters on the Isle of Wight.

Repeal
Some of the Act was implicitly repealed by the Reform Act 1832.

The whole Act except section 7 was, and in section 7 the words from the beginning of the section to "any future parliament" where those words first occurred were, repealed by section 80(7) of, and Schedule 13 to, the Representation of the People Act 1948.

Section 7 was repealed by sections 17(7)(a) and 74(2) of, and Schedule 2 to, the Electoral Administration Act 2006.

The whole Act was repealed for the Republic of Ireland by the Electoral Act 1963.

Footnotes

References
 
Halsbury's Statutes

External links
 The Parliamentary Elections Act 1695, as amended, from Legislation.gov.uk.
 Chapter XXV. Rot. Parl. 7 & 8 Gul. III. p. 5. n. 11. as originally enacted, from History of Parliament Trust

Acts of the Parliament of England
1695 in law
1695 in England
Election law in the United Kingdom
Election legislation